Aire is the seventh studio album by the Argentine singer Pablo Ruiz. It was released on January 21, 1997.

Track list 

 Aire – 4:51
 Lola
 Te Quiero Junto A Mi
 La Mar De Tu Piel
 Morir De Pie
 Amando, Amando
 A Flor De Piel
 Cuerpo A Cuerpo
 El Viento Me Llevo A Tu Corazón
 Regressa A Mi Corazón
 Gota A Gota
 Lola (Remix version) (Bonus track)

References 

Pablo Ruiz (singer) albums
1997 albums